Fama IM is a free software instant messaging client for Linux and Unix that supports the use of multiple instant messaging protocols.

It uses the Telepathy software framework for server communications and ncurses to provide a console-bound user interface. Currently no graphical interface is planned.

Supported protocols
XMPP (mostly supported)
MSN (working in development branch)
Purple (IRC not working)

See also

Multiprotocol instant messaging application
Comparison of instant messaging protocols
Comparison of instant messaging clients
Comparison of cross-platform instant messaging clients

External links
Fama IM Project website

Free instant messaging clients
Instant messaging clients for Linux
Free XMPP clients
Software that uses ncurses